Robert Briggs (died 1615), of Old Malton, Yorkshire, was an English politician.

He was a Member (MP) of the Parliament of England for Boroughbridge in 1586.

References

16th-century births
1615 deaths
English MPs 1586–1587
Members of the Parliament of England for constituencies in Yorkshire
People from Malton, North Yorkshire